Diego Di Cecco (born 1 July 1996) is an Italian football player. He plays as a right back for Castenaso Calcio.

Club career

Piacenza 
On 28 August 2016, Di Cecco made his professional debut, in Serie C, for Piacenza as a substitute replacing Saber Hraiech in the 91st minute of a 1–1 away draw against Lucchese. On 11 September he played his first entire match for Piacenza, a 1–1 away draw against Renate. On 26 February 2017, Di Cecco scored his first professional goal, and the winning goal of the match, in the 78th minute of a 1–0 home win over Pistoiese. On 30 July 2017 he played his first match in Coppa Italia, a 1–0 home win over Massese in the first round.

Career statistics

Club

References

External links 
 
 
 Diego Di Cecco at Tuttocampo

1996 births
Italian footballers
Living people
Association football defenders
Piacenza Calcio 1919 players
Serie C players
Serie D players